Angora station is a SEPTA railway station in Philadelphia. It serves the Media/Wawa Line and is officially located at 58th Street near Baltimore Avenue in Southwest Philadelphia's Angora neighborhood, however the actual location is south of Baltimore Avenue. Part of Cobbs Creek Parkway runs along 58th Street from Baltimore Avenue, over the railroad bridge, to nearby Hoffman Avenue. In 2013, this station saw 36 boardings and 37 alightings on an average weekday, making it SEPTA's least used regional rail station.

Angora station lies several blocks southeast of the Angora Loop station, which is the western terminus of Route 34 on the SEPTA Subway-Surface Trolley Lines, a line that runs along Baltimore Avenue, three blocks north of the station.

Station layout
Angora has two low-level side platforms.

References

External links
SEPTA – Angora Station
1973 former Angora Station House photograph (Existing Railroad Stations in Philadelphia County, Pennsylvania)
 58th Street entrance from Google Maps Street View

SEPTA Regional Rail stations
Stations on the West Chester Line
Railway stations in Philadelphia